Sabitawasis Beach 89 C-1 is an Indian reserve of the Fishing Lake First Nation in Saskatchewan.

References

Indian reserves in Saskatchewan
Fishing Lake First Nation